The muscular system is an organ system consisting of skeletal, smooth, and cardiac muscle. It permits movement of the body, maintains posture, and circulates blood throughout the body. The muscular systems in vertebrates are controlled through the nervous system although some muscles (such as the cardiac muscle) can be completely autonomous. Together with the skeletal system in the human, it forms the musculoskeletal system, which is responsible for the movement of the body.

Types 

There are three distinct types of muscle: skeletal muscle, cardiac or heart muscle, and smooth (non-striated) muscle. Muscles provide strength, balance, posture, movement, and heat for the body to keep warm.

There are over 650 muscles in the human body. A kind of elastic tissue makes up each muscle, which consists of thousands, or tens of thousands, of small muscle fibers. Each fiber comprises many tiny strands called fibrils, impulses from nerve cells control the contraction of each muscle fiber.

Skeletal 

Skeletal muscle, is a type of striated muscle, composed of muscle cells, called muscle fibers, which are in turn composed of myofibrils. Myofibrils are composed of sarcomeres, the basic building blocks of striated muscle tissue. Upon stimulation by an action potential, skeletal muscles perform a coordinated contraction by shortening each sarcomere. The best proposed model for understanding contraction is the sliding filament model of muscle contraction. Within the sarcomere, actin and myosin fibers overlap in a contractile motion towards each other. Myosin filaments have club-shaped myosin heads that project toward the actin filaments, and provide attachment points on binding sites for the actin filaments. The myosin heads move in a coordinated style; they swivel toward the center of the sarcomere, detach and then reattach to the nearest active site of the actin filament. This is called a ratchet type drive system.

This process consumes large amounts of adenosine triphosphate (ATP), the energy source of the cell. ATP binds to the cross-bridges between myosin heads and actin filaments. The release of energy powers the swiveling of the myosin head. When ATP is used, it becomes adenosine diphosphate (ADP), and since muscles store little ATP, they must continuously replace the discharged ADP with ATP. Muscle tissue also contains a stored supply of a fast-acting recharge chemical, creatine phosphate, which when necessary can assist with the rapid regeneration of ADP into ATP.

Calcium ions are required for each cycle of the sarcomere. Calcium is released from the sarcoplasmic reticulum into the sarcomere when a muscle is stimulated to contract. This calcium uncovers the actin-binding sites. When the muscle no longer needs to contract, the calcium ions are pumped from the sarcomere and back into storage in the sarcoplasmic reticulum.

There are approximately 639 skeletal muscles in the human body.

Cardiac 

Heart muscle is striated muscle but is distinct from skeletal muscle because the muscle fibers are laterally connected. Furthermore, just as with smooth muscles, their movement is involuntary. Heart muscle is controlled by the sinus node influenced by the autonomic nervous system.

Smooth 

Smooth muscle contraction is regulated by the autonomic nervous system, hormones, and local chemical signals, allowing for gradual and sustained contractions. This type of muscle tissue is also capable of adapting to different levels of stretch and tension, which is important for maintaining proper blood flow and the movement of materials through the digestive system.

Physiology

Contraction 

Neuromuscular junctions are the focal point where a motor neuron attaches to a muscle. Acetylcholine, (a neurotransmitter used in skeletal muscle contraction) is released from the axon terminal of the nerve cell when an action potential reaches the microscopic junction called a synapse. A group of chemical messengers cross the synapse and stimulate the formation of electrical changes, which are produced in the muscle cell when the acetylcholine binds to receptors on its surface. Calcium is released from its storage area in the cell's sarcoplasmic reticulum. An impulse from a nerve cell causes calcium release and brings about a single, short muscle contraction called a muscle twitch. If there is a problem at the neuromuscular junction, a very prolonged contraction may occur, such as the muscle contractions that result from tetanus. Also, a loss of function at the junction can produce paralysis.

Skeletal muscles are organized into hundreds of motor units, each of which involves a motor neuron, attached by a series of thin finger-like structures called axon terminals. These attach to and control discrete bundles of muscle fibers. A coordinated and fine-tuned response to a specific circumstance will involve controlling the precise number of motor units used. While individual muscle units contract as a unit, the entire muscle can contract on a predetermined basis due to the structure of the motor unit. Motor unit coordination, balance, and control frequently come under the direction of the cerebellum of the brain. This allows for complex muscular coordination with little conscious effort, such as when one drives a car without thinking about the process.

Tendon 

A tendon is a piece of connective tissue that connects a muscle to a bone. When a muscle contracts, it pulls against the skeleton to create movement. A tendon connects this muscle to a bone, making this function possible.

Aerobic and anaerobic muscle activity 
At rest, the body produces the majority of its ATP aerobically in the mitochondria without producing lactic acid or other fatiguing byproducts. During exercise, the method of ATP production varies depending on the fitness of the individual as well as the duration and intensity of exercise. At lower activity levels, when exercise continues for a long duration (several minutes or longer), energy is produced aerobically by combining oxygen with carbohydrates and fats stored in the body.

During activity that is higher in intensity, with possible duration decreasing as intensity increases, ATP production can switch to anaerobic pathways, such as the use of the creatine phosphate and the phosphagen system or anaerobic glycolysis. Aerobic ATP production is biochemically much slower and can only be used for long-duration, low-intensity exercise, but produces no fatiguing waste products that can not be removed immediately from the sarcomere and the body, and it results in a much greater number of ATP molecules per fat or carbohydrate molecule. Aerobic training allows the oxygen delivery system to be more efficient, allowing aerobic metabolism to begin quicker. Anaerobic ATP production produces ATP much faster and allows near-maximal intensity exercise, but also produces significant amounts of lactic acid which render high-intensity exercise unsustainable for more than several minutes. The phosphagen system is also anaerobic. It allows for the highest levels of exercise intensity, but intramuscular stores of phosphocreatine are very limited and can only provide energy for exercises lasting up to ten seconds. Recovery is very quick, with full creatine stores regenerated within five minutes.

Clinical significance 

Multiple diseases can affect the muscular system.

See also 
 Major systems of the human body
 Intramuscular coordination

References

Further reading

External links 

 
 Online Muscle Tutorial
 GetBody Smart Muscle system tutorials and quizzes
 MedBio.info  Use and formation of ATP in muscle